Declarative may refer to:
 Declarative learning, acquiring information that one can speak about
 Declarative memory, one of two types of long term human memory
 Declarative programming, a computer programming paradigm
 Declarative sentence, a type of sentence that makes a statement
 Declarative mood, a grammatical verb form used in declarative sentences

See also
 Declaration (disambiguation)